"Serenade" is Tackey & Tsubasa's fourth single under the Avex Trax label.

Overview
Serenade is Tackey & Tsubasa's fourth single, and currently their lowest selling and lowest ranking single. The a-side song "Serenade" was used as the Olympus "μDigital" commercial song. The other song "Starry Sky" is Tackey & Tsubasa's first Christmas themed song.

Sample of the translated lyrics:
Don't cry...serenade
In the sky that has begun to shine, is a red melody
Riding on a promise of love
Shine...serenade
Fireworks dance with music
With a kiss for you, it will never die
Only you..., those days...
With a surreal love, in reality
Serenade

Track listing

Regular CD Format
 "" (Hitoshi Haba) - 4:58
 "Starry Sky" (Mikiko Tagata, Junkoo) - 5:01
 "Queen of R" (Hideyuki Obata, Ayumi Miyazaki) - 3:59
 "Serenade: karaoke" - 4:59
 "Starry Sky: karaoke" - 5:01

Limited CD Format
 "" (Hitoshi Haba) - 4:58
 "Starry Sky" (Mikiko Tagata, Junkoo) - 5:01
 "Serenade: Takizawa Part Version" - 4:58
 "Serenade: Tsubasa Part Version" - 4:58
 "Serenade: karaoke" - 4:59
 "Starry Sky: karaoke" - 5:01

Personnel
 Takizawa Hideaki - vocals
 Imai Tsubasa - vocals

TV performances
?, 2004 - Music Station

Charts
Oricon Sales Chart (Japan)

RIAJ Certification
As of December 2004, "Serenade" has been certified gold for shipments of over 100,000 by the Recording Industry Association of Japan.

References 
  
 

2004 singles
Tackey & Tsubasa songs
2004 songs
Avex Trax singles